Shramik Sangram Committee (Workers Struggle Committee) is a leftwing organisation in West Bengal, India. SSC publishes Shramik Istehar.

References

Political parties in West Bengal
Political parties with year of establishment missing